Takuya Nakayama (born July 24, 1994) is a Japanese professional basketball player who plays for the Akita Northern Happinets of the B.League in Japan. He wears #17 because his mother, Yuko was born on the 17th day of the month. On April 22, 2017, Nakayama made the longest shot of the B.League at first quarter buzzer beater. On December 30. 2017, he hit the another longest shot of the league at the third quarter buzzer beater.

B.League Multiple-time steal leader
He won the Steal leader award two years in a row.

Career statistics

Regular season 

|-
|style="background-color:#FFCCCC" align="left" | 2016-17
| align="left" | Akita
|22 ||5 || 16.5 ||45.9  || 40.7 ||66.7  || 2.0 || 1.2 || 0.9 ||0.1  || 4.7
|-
| align="left" | 2017-18
| align="left" | Akita
|56 ||44 || 24 ||45.7  || 31.7 ||59.4  || 4.3 || 3.8 || bgcolor="CFECEC"|2.1* ||0.1  || 8.5
|-
| align="left" | 2018-19
| align="left" | Akita
| 58 || 44 || 29.9 ||40.8  ||18.5  || 62.2 ||4.8  ||5.4  ||bgcolor="CFECEC"|2.2* ||0.1||7.3
|-
| align="left" | 2019-20
| align="left" | Akita
| 32 || 17 || 23.7 ||46.7  ||29.4  || 59.6 ||3.7  ||3.6  ||2.1 ||0.0||6.7
|-
| align="left" | 2020-21
| align="left" | Akita
| 56 || 21 || 22.8 ||.405  ||.256  || .724 ||3.5  ||3.2  ||1.5 ||0.0||6.8
|-

Playoffs 

|-
|style="text-align:left;"|2016-17
|style="text-align:left;"|Akita
| 2 ||  || 23.0 || .500 || .333 || 1.000 || 2.0 || 0.5 || 2.0 || 0 || 5.5
|-
|style="text-align:left;"|2017-18
|style="text-align:left;"|Akita
| 5 || 3 || 20:37 || .265 || .250 || .500 || 5.4 || 3.4 || 1.4 || 0 || 4.4
|-

Early cup games 

|-
|style="text-align:left;"|2017
|style="text-align:left;"|Akita
| 2 || 1 || 18:22 || .385 || .167 || 1.000 || 4.5 || 1.5 || 1.5 || 0 || 5.0
|-
|style="text-align:left;"|2018
|style="text-align:left;"|Akita
|2 || 2 || 27:49 || .444 || .000 || .500 || 5.0 || 3.0 || 3.5 || 0 || 5.5
|-
|style="text-align:left;"|2019
|style="text-align:left;"|Akita
|2 || 2 || 25:14 || .333 || 1.000 || 1.000 || 5.5 || 1.5 || 1.0|| 0.5 || 3.5
|-

Preseason games

|-
| align="left" |2018
| align="left" | Akita
| 2 || 1 || 27.4 || .100 ||.000  || 1.000||4.0 || 5.0||2.5 || 0.0 ||  3.0
|-
| align="left" |2019
| align="left" | Akita
| 3 || 1 || 21.9 || .412 ||.000  || .857||2.3 || 4.3||4.3 || 0.0 ||  5.7
|-

Source: Changwon1Changwon2
Source: UtsunomiyaToyamaSendai

Outfits

He plays with Nike Kyrie Low 2  basketball shoes and Stance socks and wears Air Force 1 Foamposite Pro Cup shoes on the Akita's snowy streets.

Shē pass

His one-handed overhead pass to his side is called "Sheeeh! pass",  because it looks like Sheeeh! pose in Japanese cartoon, Osomatsu-kun.

External links
Highlights 2018
Defence Highlights 2019
Tsukuba vs Tokai 2016
Stats

References

1994 births
Living people
Tokai University alumni
Akita Northern Happinets players
Japanese men's basketball players
Sportspeople from Yokohama
Guards (basketball)